Anopeltis is a genus of fungi within the Capnodiaceae family. This is a monotypic genus, containing the single species Anopeltis venezuelensis.

References

External links 
 Anopeltis at Index Fungorum

Capnodiaceae
Monotypic Dothideomycetes genera